Norman ("Norm") W. Tate (born January 2, 1942, in Oswald, West Virginia) is a retired long jumper from the United States, who set a personal best of wind-assisted 8.23 meters at a meet in El Paso on May 22, 1971. He represented his native country at the 1968 Summer Olympics in Mexico City, Mexico, where he was eliminated in the qualifying round of the men's triple jump.

He trained Jack Pierce, who was an Olympic medalist in the hurdles at the 1992 Summer Olympics.

References

 1971 Year Ranking

External links
 

1942 births
Living people
People from Raleigh County, West Virginia
American male triple jumpers
American male long jumpers
Athletes (track and field) at the 1968 Summer Olympics
Olympic track and field athletes of the United States
Track and field athletes from West Virginia